Höijer or Hoijer is a surname. Notable people with the surname include:

Höijer
 Björn-Erik Höijer (1907–1996), Swedish writer
 Theodor Höijer (1843–1910),
 Nils Fredrik Höijer (1857–1925), Swedish missionary

Hoijer
 Harry Hoijer (1904–1976), linguist and anthropologist